

Racial term

 Hottentot (racial term), both an ethnic term and a term of abuse

Ethnic groups and their languages
 Khoekhoe, the main ethnic group for which Hottentot was once the usual term in English
 Khoekhoe language
 Khoisan, a wider ethnic group including the Khoikhoi for which Hottentot was also widely used
 Khoisan language
 Hottentot Venus, term used for at least two Khoikhoi women exhibited as freak-show attractions in nineteenth-century Europe

Species of animals and plants

 Hottentot (fish), a species of sea bream
 Africanis, a landrace of dog sometimes called 'Hottentot hunting dogs'
 Carpobrotus edulis, commonly known as 'hottentot-fig'
 Trachyandra, commonly known as 'hottentot cabbage'
 Blue-billed teal, a species of bird sometimes called the 'Hottentot teal'
 Hottentotta, a genus of scorpion

Organisations
 Cape Corps, formerly Hottentot Corps, the first Coloured unit to be formed in the South African army
 Terre Haute Hottentots, a baseball team

Artworks
 The Hottentot, a 1922 film based on a 1920 Broadway play of the same title
 The Hottentot, a 1929 film
 Hottentottilaulu ("The Hottentot Song"), a Finnish song 

Language and nationality disambiguation pages